Maurice Lee Braddell (23 November 1900 – 28 July 1990) was an English actor, author and art restorer.

Maurice Braddell was born in Folkestone, Kent, England, and lived in New York City for much of his life.
He was the son of Sir Thomas Braddell and Lady Violet Nassau (Kirby) Braddell.
The Braddell family had a long association with the Straits Settlements (Singapore) where they served as lawyers and judges. 
Maurice Braddell married Jean Shannon (Macleod) Harman of Chesham, Bucks who had previously taken the name Braddell. 
As well as acting in both silent films and talkies, Braddell wrote the 1935 farce of the same name on which the 1936 film, It's You I Want is based.

Over 40 years later, he was retired from films and working as an art restorer, living in New York's East Village, when he was cast in Andy Warhol's 1968 film, Flesh.

Filmography

Actor

Screenwriter
 Love, Life and Laughter (1934)

References

External links
 

1900 births
1990 deaths
20th-century English male actors
English male stage actors
English male film actors
People from Folkestone
Male actors from New York City
English emigrants to the United States
20th-century English male writers